Tomasamil is a highly eroded dormant volcano in south-west Bolivia, at the edge of the Atacama Desert of coastal Chile. It is also located 6 km east of Ollagüe, another extinct Ultra on the Chile-Bolivia border. Due to its location, the peak of Tomasamil often has little to no snow, and the area around the mountain is usually dominated by pockets of occasional shrub and exposed dirt, along with expansive salt flats, typical of the region it is located in. The peak of Tomasamil itself is made out of exposed dry rocks. However, this is a relatively recent phenomenon, as in previous years Tomasamil usually had enough precipitation for the now dry and exposed peak to be snow-capped. It is approximately located 197 km south-west of the famous Salar de Uyuni salt flats and is also relatively close to the Salar de Chiguana in the general area, but is closer to the city of Potosí.
Near the lower parts of Tomasamil, animals such as the vicuña, a relative of the llama, and plants such as the yareta, which are a moss-like plant found on high elevation areas of the tripoint between Chile, Bolivia and Argentina.

Gallery

See also
 List of Ultras of South America

References

External links
 "Cerro Tomasamil, Bolivia" on Peakbagger

Mountains of Potosí Department